Romualdo Bueso Melghem (born 9 October 1947) is a Honduran politician. He served as deputy of the National Congress of Honduras representing the Liberal Party of Honduras for Intibucá during the 2006–10 period.

References

1947 births
Living people
People from Intibucá Department
Deputies of the National Congress of Honduras
Liberal Party of Honduras politicians